This is a list of street railways in Mexico by state. The list includes all tram systems, past and present.

Note for Mexico (in general): Approximately 1,000 towns had tramways. Most were worked by animal traction, and connected railway stations with town centers. Some lines were worked by small steam locomotives. Horse- or mule-drawn vehicles used on some lines were eventually equipped with petrol (gasoline) engines (Morrison ). Opening and closing dates are difficult to establish because the Mexican government did not conduct surveys of tramway systems between 1907 and 1922 (Morrison .

Data for 1907 were published in 1912, by which time the Mexican Revolution (1910–1921) was underway. Thereafter, government statistics included only those tramway systems with federal concessions—e.g. intercity lines—for the years 1922–1934.

The tables below includes fewer than half the number of towns stated by Morrison. Peschkes (Part One, 1980, pages 10–38) tabulates 406 systems, and states (Part Four, 1998, page 140) that an additional 51 systems had been located. The list below excludes hacienda tramways, which transported crops, other goods and passengers to and from plantations.

Aguascalientes

Baja California

Baja California Sur

Campeche

Chiapas

Chihuahua

Note for Cerrito: Peschkes (Part One, 1980, Page 28) states that the location of this town is "unknown."
Note for (Hidalgo del) Parral: Peschkes (Part One, 1980, page 17) states that animal and electric traction was used in Parral. Morrison  states that "Parral never had a horse tram line." Operation of electric tramway suspended (after fewer than nine months) because of electric substation equipment breakdown. It is not known whether the system reopened.

Coahuila

Colima

Durango

Note for Lerdo – Gómez Palacio: Gómez Palacio – Torreón (Coahuila) opened 3 July 1901. See also Torreón, Coahuila.

Guanajuato

Guerrero

Hidalgo

Jalisco

Estado de México (State of Mexico)

Mexico City

Michoacán (de Ocampo)

Morelos

Nayarit

Nuevo León

Oaxaca

Puebla

Note for Galapaxco: Peschkes (Part One, 1980, Page 34) states that the location of this town is "unknown."
Note for Puebla – El Valor: Opened in stages, completed 1897.
Note for Puebla – Cholula – Huexotzingo: Opened in stages, completed 1897. Puebla – Cholula electrified 1924. Cholula – Huejotzingo not electrified.

Querétaro

San Luis Potosí

Note for Mina Asarco: Peschkes (Part One, 1980, Page 30) states that the location of this town is "unknown." Mina is Spanish for "mine," and Asarco  is believed to refer to ASARCO, Inc.

Sinaloa

Sonora

Tabasco

Tamaulipas

Tlaxcala

Veracruz (de Ignacio de la Llave)

Yucatán

Note for Yucatán: In addition to urban tramways, "central Yucatán" (i.e. the northeastern part of Yucatán state) had more than 1,500 km (950 mi) of intercity tramways, all worked by horses or mules. At least seven such lines extended from Mérida . In addition, Yucatán also had approximately 3,000 km (1,900 mi) of hacienda tramways. These were built to transport henequen crops from plantation fields to railway stations . Some henequen plantations closed because of the Great Depression, and the hacienda tramways were handed to railway companies or other enterprises. Many hacienda tramways were eventually abandoned but tracks remained in use by local residents . A few hacienda tramways continued in operation after 2000.

Zacatecas

References

Mexico
Streetcars